Byrum is the biggest town and municipal seat on the Danish island Læsø in Kattegat. The town is the only one on the island not located by the sea (except for Mejeriby). The town has a population of 444 (1 January 2022).

Byrum is located in North Denmark Region, Læsø Municipality.

References

Cities and towns in the North Jutland Region
Municipal seats of the North Jutland Region
Læsø